Anton Francesco Lucini (1610 – after 1661) was an Italian engraver and printmaker, best known for his etchings of the work Dell'Arcano del Mare by Sir Robert Dudley.

Lucini was born at Florence and he studied etching under Stefano della Bella and Jacques Callot, who had lived in Florence 1612–1621, and whose prints imparted a strong influence to Florentine printmakers.<ref name="ticozzi">{{cite book|first= Stefano|last= Ticozzi|year=1830|title=Dizionario degli architetti, scultori, pittori, intagliatori in rame ed in pietra, coniatori di medaglie, musaicisti, niellatori, intarsiatori d'ogni etá e d'ogni nazione''' (Volume 1–2)|page= 356|publisher=Gaetano Schiepatti |location=Milan |url=https://books.google.com/books?id=9QwFAAAAYAAJ&pg=RA3-PA356}}</ref>

Lucini worked at a series of engravings entitled Disegni della guerra, assedio dell'armata turchesca all'Isola di Malta l'anno MDXLV published in Bologna (1631). Then he worked at the monumental work Dell'arcano del mare'' by Sir Robert Dudley published in Florence 1646–1647. The distinctive Baroque style of Dudley's charts is attributable to the elegant engraving of Antonio Francesco Lucini, who stated that he spent 12 years and used 5,000 pounds of copper to produce the plates of exceptional quality.

References

External links 
 Work by Anton Francesco Lucini

1610 births
Italian printmakers
Italian engravers
Artists from Florence
1660s deaths